The Alice Springs Desert Park is an environmental education facility and wildlife park in Alice Springs in the Northern Territory of Australia.

It is an institutional member of the Zoo and Aquarium Association and Botanic Gardens Conservation International.

The park contains native animals and plants representative of Central Australian desert environments, and contributes to their conservation through research programs as well as through public education. It offers people the opportunity to experience the variety of the deserts of central Australia, exploring the relationships between the plants, animals and people.

The area is culturally important to the local Arrernte people. Much of the work of the park is under the auspices of their decision-makers and caretakers – people once known as the park's traditional owners.

Exhibits and facilities

The park contains three separate walk-through desert habitat areas accessed through a  trail: Desert Rivers, Sand Country, and Woodland. In addition, it has a Nocturnal House and a nature theatre. The entrance area includes an exhibition centre, rest rooms, and café.

Desert Rivers

In this habitat, visitors walk through dry river beds, and areas that have been flooded, and past swamps and water holes. The plants here include river red gums, coolibah trees, aquatic plants, and reeds. Animals in this habitat include finches, cockatoos, water birds, frogs, and fish. Demonstrations here show how the Aboriginal people use this habitat to harvest food and medicine.

Sand Country

This exhibit is a re-creation of the sandy desert including clay, gypsum, and salt pans.

Nocturnal house

The Nocturnal House is located between the Sand Country and Woodland habitats, and is home to many Central Australian reptiles, invertebrates, birds, and mammals that are active during the night. The collection includes some reptiles that may be active during the day but difficult to find in the desert.

Woodland

The Woodland habitat includes enclosures for kangaroos and emus. Visitors can walk among the kangaroos in their exhibit area.

Nature Theatre

Presentations at the Nature Theatre show visitors some of the animals that might be seen while walking through the park, including demonstrations with free-flying birds of prey.

Aboriginal Survival

Presentations at the park, include information on Aboriginal survival one focusing on water gathering and another on food gathering.  The food gathering presentation is particularly focused on the Arrernte people and includes information on sex roles, with the distinct jobs of men and women. Information on kinship focuses on Arrernte skin names and the rules for relationships built around the skin name groupings.

Animals

Birds

Australian boobook
Australian magpie
Australian reed-warbler
Banded lapwing
Black kite
Black-breasted buzzard
Black-faced cuckoo-shrike
Black-faced woodswallow
Bourke’s parrot
Budgerigar
Bush stone-curlew
Chestnut-eared finch
Chestnut-rumped thornbill
Chiming wedgebill
Cinnamon quail-thrush
Crested bellbird
Crimson chat
Diamond dove
Dusky grasswren
Eastern barn owl
Emu
Eyrean grasswren
Golden-backed honeyeater
Grey teal
Grey-headed honeyeater
Hooded robin
Inland dotterel
Inland thornbill
Little buttonquail
Little grebe
Masked woodswallow
Mulga parrot
Orange chat
Painted finch
Peaceful dove
Pied honeyeater
Pied stilt
Plains turkey
Princess parrot
Red-capped robin
Red-tailed black cockatoo
Rufous whistler
Rufous-crowned emu-wren
Sacred kingfisher
Southern whiteface
Spinifex pigeon
Splendid fairy-wren
Tawny frogmouth
Wedge-tailed eagle
Western bowerbird
Whistling kite
White-fronted honeyeater
White-winged fairy-wren
White-winged triller
Yellow-rumped thornbill

Fish

Agassiz’s glass fish
Barred grunter
Bony bream
Chequered rainbowfish
Desert rainbowfish
Purple-spotted gudgeon
Tandan catfish

Mammals

Burrowing bettong
Central rock-rat
Dingo
Fat-tailed dunnart
Ghost bat
Golden bandicoot
Greater bilby
Greater stick-nest rat
Mala
Numbat
Palyoora
Red kangaroo
Red-tailed phascogale
Short-beaked echidna
Spinifex hopping-mouse

Reptiles

Canegrass dragon
Centralian rough knob-tailed gecko
Central military dragon
Central netted dragon
Centralian carpet python
Desert death adder
Desert skink
Fire-tailed skink
Gidgee spiny-tailed skink
Inland bearded dragon
Lined earless dragon
Mulga snake
Northern spiny-tailed gecko
Panther skink
Perentie
Pygmy mulga monitor
Slater's skink
Spinifex legless lizard
Stimson's banded rock python
Thorny devil
Woma python

References

External links

1997 establishments in Australia
Zoos established in 1997
Zoos in the Northern Territory
Buildings and structures in Alice Springs
Australia
Tourist attractions in Alice Springs
Parks in the Northern Territory
Wildlife parks in Australia